A list of films released in Japan in 1986 (see 1986 in film).

See also 
 1986 in Japan
 1986 in Japanese television

References

Footnotes

Sources

External links
 Japanese films of 1986 at the Internet Movie Database

1986
Japanese
Films